Bhootnath is an Indian fantasy television series based on Devaki Nandan Khatri's novel of the same name. It was originally telecast on Doordarshan's DD National between 1989 and 1990.The show starred Benjamin Gilani in the title role, and was narrated by Indian actor Ashok Kumar.

External links

Indian fantasy television series
1980s Indian television series
1989 Indian television series debuts
Television shows based on Indian novels
Indian period television series